Jenny is a 1970 American drama film starring Marlo Thomas, in her film debut, and Alan Alda, produced by ABC Pictures and released by Cinerama Releasing Corp. Singer-songwriter Harry Nilsson provided Jenny 's theme song, "Waiting".

Plot
Jenny, a young small-town woman, moves away to the city when she becomes pregnant through a one-night stand. She meets film director Delano, who has received a draft notice and does not want to be inducted into the Army. Jenny and Delano take a liking to each other. Learning that an acquaintance got out of having to serve by having a baby on the way, Delano offers to marry Jenny, claim paternity and support her baby, if she in turn will play along, and he can avoid being drafted.

In the months until Jenny's baby is born, the couple experiences the ups and downs of their in-name-only marriage, including a visit back to her family and hometown, and his ongoing relationship with another woman, as Delano and Jenny await the outcome of his draft case.  At the end of the film, Jenny goes into labor. Delano brings Jenny a little music box; as it plays a nurse brings in Jenny's new baby. Jenny lovingly holds the newborn and begins to breastfeed as Delano looks on. The film ends with the two of them staring at the newborn, sleeping soundly in its mother's arms.

Selected cast
 Marlo Thomas as Jenny Marsh
 Alan Alda as Delano
 Marian Hailey as Kay
 Phil Bruns as Fred Callahan
 Charlotte Rae as Bella Star
 Vincent Gardenia as Mr. Marsh
 Elizabeth Wilson as Mrs. Marsh
 Stephen Strimpell as Peter

Box office
By 1973, the film had earned rentals of $2,010,000 in North America and $815,000 in other countries. After all costs were deducted, it recorded an overall loss of $1,170,000.

Reception
Roger Greenspun wrote in the New York Times:"Jenny" is a very old‐fashioned film, gently accumulating the paraphernalia of a certain opportune modernism. All the movie memories are intellectual properties of a sort that you may discard if you wish to 'sigh' over the sad‐happy story of a girl and her guy and her baby.

But it isn't so easy to make old‐fashioned movies now, and the values and life‐styles the film plays with, keep playing with it in return—so that Jenny often stumbles into (and alas, out of) a better kind of movie than it has any right to be.

Nominations
The film was nominated for the Golden Globe award for Most Promising Newcomer – Female (Marlo Thomas) in 1971.

References

External links
 
 
 

1970 films
1970 romantic drama films
ABC Motion Pictures films
American romantic drama films
1970s English-language films
Films about film directors and producers
Films about marriage
Films scored by Michael Small
Films set in New York City
Films shot in New Jersey
Films shot in New York City
American pregnancy films
Cinerama Releasing Corporation films
1970s pregnancy films
Films directed by George Bloomfield
1970 directorial debut films
1970s American films